Jabari Arthur (born August 28, 1982) is a Canadian football coach who serves as the offensive coordinator for the Calgary Dinos of U Sports football. He is a former professional wide receiver who played for eight years in the Canadian Football League (CFL). He is a two-time Grey Cup champion after winning with the Calgary Stampeders in 2008 and 2014. He is also a Vanier Cup champion with the Dinos following the team's victory in the 2019 game.

Arthur prepped at Vanier College in Montreal, winning Offensive Player-of-the-Year and Player-of-the-Year during the 2001 season. Arthur's play earned him a scholarship offer from the University of Akron, where Arthur would redshirt in 2003. After his redshirt year, new head coach J. D. Brookhart converted Arthur to a wide receiver. Currently, Arthur can be seen in the University of Akron Hall Of Fame.

He signed with the Kansas City Chiefs of the NFL as a rookie free agent. Arthur was released by the Chiefs on August 30, 2008.

Early life
Arthur attended Vanier College in Montreal, Quebec. Arthur's play as a quarterback earned him the Offensive Player-of-the-Year, as well as the Player-of-the-Year for his play during the 2001 season Arthur also participated in Track and Field.

Arthur committed to the University of Akron on July 8, 2003. Arthur was not heavily recruited, as he only received one scholarship offer.

College career
Jabari Authur played college football for the Zips. During his senior year, his Canadian Football League rights were held by the Calgary Stampeders, who drafted him in the 2007 CFL Draft even though he was returning to Akron for his senior year.

Statistics
Source:

Numbers in Bold are Akron school records

Professional career

Kansas City Chiefs
Although eligible for the 2008 NFL Draft, Arthur was not selected. He signed with the Chiefs on April 27 at the conclusion of the draft.

Calgary Stampeders
Arthur signed with the Calgary Stampeders on September 22, 2008. He won the Grey Cup championship in 2008.

Winnipeg Blue Bombers
On September 20, 2009 Arthur was traded along with fellow receiver Titus Ryan, and defensive lineman Odell Willis to the Winnipeg Blue Bombers in exchange for receivers Arjei Franklin, and Romby Bryant.

Calgary Stampeders (II)
On July 19, 2010, Arthur signed with the Calgary Stampeders. Over the span of 4 seasons, 2010 through 2013, Arthur averaged 21.5 receptions, for 261 yards,  and a total of 4 pass receptions. The 2013 CFL season being by far the best of the four years; netting 41 pass receptions for 510 yards with 3 touchdowns. Following the 2013 CFL season the Stamps resigned Arthur to a new contract; he was set to become a free-agent that off-season. Arthur only caught 9 passes in the 2014 season (77 yards, 2 touchdowns). Despite the disappointing season the Stampeders extended his contract on March 11, 2015. He played in two games in 2015 where he had one catch for 14 yards. He became a free agent upon the expiry of his contract on February 9, 2016.

Coaching career
After sitting out the 2016 season, Arthur was announced as the wide receivers coach for the Calgary Dinos on April 28, 2017. He won the 2019 Vanier Cup with the Dinos in his third year with the program. He was promoted to offensive coordinator on January 24, 2022.

References

External links
 ESPN profile
 Calgary Stampeders bio

1982 births
Living people
Akron Zips football players
American football wide receivers
Anglophone Quebec people
Calgary Dinos football players
Calgary Stampeders players
Canadian players of American football
Kansas City Chiefs players
Players of Canadian football from Quebec
Canadian football people from Montreal
Winnipeg Blue Bombers players